Leptothorax faberi is a species of ant in the genus Leptothorax. It is endemic to Canada.

References

faberi
Hymenoptera of North America
Insects of Canada
Endemic fauna of Canada
Insects described in 1983
Taxonomy articles created by Polbot